Svend Armand Albrechtsen (27 February 1917 – 13 April 1975) was a Danish footballer, who played his entire career for Akademisk Boldklub. He gained three caps for the Denmark national football team from 1938 to 1939.

Personal life
Albrechtsen was an internee at Buchenwald concentration camp.

References

External links
 

1917 births
1975 deaths
Danish men's footballers
Denmark international footballers
Association football forwards
Akademisk Boldklub players
Buchenwald concentration camp survivors